Olympic Youth Ouezzane, also called OJ Ouezzane is a Moroccan football club currently playing in the third division. They also have a Basketball club playing in the division I Federation Royal Morocaine Basketball (FRMBB). The club is located in the town of Ouezzane.

References
 GNFA 1 Unofficial Website

Football clubs in Morocco
Sports clubs in Morocco